Will Staples is an American screenwriter, producer, and novelist. He is best known for his work on the video game Call of Duty: Modern Warfare 3, the films Without Remorse
and Sweet Girl, the television series The Right Stuff, and his novel, Animals.

Career 

In 2011, Staples and screenwriter Paul Haggis wrote the script for the video game, Call of Duty: Modern Warfare 3, which was the largest entertainment release in history at the time.

On October 25, 2013, Deadline announced that Ben Affleck and Warner Bros had hired Staples to write a geopolitical thriller about a team of mercenaries in Eastern Congo for Affleck to star in and direct. The following year, Warner announced that Staples had been hired to write a movie set in the world of illicit animal trafficking for Leonardo DiCaprio, Tom Hardy, and Tobey Maguire to produce and star in.

In May 2014, Staples was hired to rewrite Mission: Impossible – Rogue Nation.

In 2017, National Geographic announced that Staples would be creating The Right Stuff television series based on Tom Wolfe’s 1979 book The Right Stuff, with Leonardo DiCaprio executive producing. The series moved to Disney+ in 2020.

Will's first novel, Animals, a thriller about global animal trafficking, organized crime and a deadly pandemic, was released on March 30, 2021.

Two of his screenplays have appeared on The Black List, an annual list compiled by Hollywood executives of their favorite unproduced screenplays – once for his adaption of the book King of Heists by J. North Conway, and again for Landslide, an adaptation of the book How to Break a Terrorist, co-written with Tony Camerino.

Filmography

Film

Television

Video games

References

External links 
 

21st-century American novelists
American male novelists
American screenwriters
American male screenwriters
Year of birth missing (living people)
Living people
21st-century American male writers